Abdelhak Sailaa (born 26 November 1996) is an Algerian footballer who plays for Saudi club Al-Sadd.

Career 
In 2020, he signed a contract with MC Alger.
In 2021, he signed a contract with ASO Chlef.

On 19 June 2022, Sailaa joined Al-Sadd.

References

External links

1996 births
Living people
Algerian footballers
Association football defenders
CR Belouizdad players
MC Saïda players
MC El Eulma players
MC Alger players
USM Bel Abbès players
ASO Chlef players
Al-Sadd FC (Saudi football club) players
21st-century Algerian people
Algerian Ligue 2 players
Algerian Ligue Professionnelle 1 players
Saudi Second Division players
Algerian expatriate footballers
Expatriate footballers in Saudi Arabia
Algerian expatriate sportspeople in Saudi Arabia
People from Rouïba